The 2004 Oceania Athletics Championships were held at the Townsville Sports Reserve in Townsville, Queensland, Australia, between December 16–18, 2004.

A total of 38 events were contested, 20 by men and 18 by women.

Medal summary
Medal winners were published.  Results for the athletes from Papua New Guinea can be found on the
webpage of Athletics PNG.  Complete results can be found on the website of the Ligue de Nouvelle Calédonie Athlétisme (LNCA).

Men

Women

Medal table (unofficial)

Participation (unofficial)
The participation of athletes from 18 countries could be determined from the published results list.

References

Oceania Athletics Championships
International athletics competitions hosted by Australia
Oceanian Championships
2004 in Australian sport
December 2004 sports events in Australia